The Notter is a stream in Thuringia, Germany. It flows into the Unstrut west of Bollstedt.

See also
 List of rivers of Thuringia

References

External links 

Rivers of Thuringia